Upper Belgrave Lodge is a house at the east end of Belgrave Avenue, the road connecting the B5445 road between Chester and Wrexham, and Eaton Hall, Cheshire, England.  It is recorded in the National Heritage List for England as a designated Grade II listed building.

History

The lodge was built in 1877–79 and designed by the Chester architect John Douglas.  The patron was the 1st Duke of Westminster.

Architecture

The house is built in a T-plan with 1½ storeys in Jacobethan style.  It is constructed in red brick with scattered sandstone blocks; the hipped roofs are tiled and have terracotta finials.  The upper storey of the main part of the house is timber framed and jettied with pargeting in the panels; the gable end contains a four-light window and above this is tile hanging.  Under the gable is a carved bressumer.  To the west is an oak-framed porch on a sandstone plinth.  The doorway has a Tudor arch above which is a pargeted panel.  The rear wing is single-storeyed.

See also

Listed buildings in Eaton, Cheshire West and Chester
List of houses and associated buildings by John Douglas

References

John Douglas buildings
Houses completed in 1879
Grade II listed buildings in Cheshire
Grade II listed houses
Houses in Cheshire
Timber framed buildings in Cheshire